Rosa Beltrán (born 15 March 1960) is a Mexican writer, lecturer and academic. 
On 12 June 12, 2014, she was chosen by the Academia Mexicana de la Lengua to occupy seat 306 in its membership.

Life
Beltrán was born in Mexico City in 1960. 
She received a degree in Hispanic literature at the National Autonomous University of Mexico (UNAM) and a doctorate in comparative literature at the University of California, Los Angeles (UCLA). She is the author of several novels. In 1994, she received an award from the American Association of University Women for her essays on writers of the 20th century. Her work has been translated into English, Italian, French, German, Dutch and Slovenian, and her stories have appeared in anthologies published in Spain, Italy, Holland, Canada, USA and Mexico.

Beltrán has taught at UCLA, Hebrew University of Jerusalem, Ramon Llull University, University of Colorado, and currently teaches in the graduate program in comparative literature at UNAM. She was deputy director of La Jornada Semanal and is a member of the Sistema Nacional de Creadores de Arte. She serves as UNAM's Director of Literature, Coordination of Cultural Diffusion, and has worked for Milenio's cultural supplement, Laberinto.

Awards and honors
1991, Grant, Fondo Nacional para la Cultura y las Artes
1993, Grant, Centro Mexicano de Escritores
1993, Fulbright scholar
1995, Premio Planeta-Joaquín Mortiz de Novela award, for La corte de los ilusos
1997, Young Scholar Award, UNAM
1997, Florence Fishbaum award for her essay América sin americanismos
2011, Sor Juana Ines de la Cruz recognition, UNAM

Selected works
 La corte de los ilusos 1995; Planeta Publishing Corporation, 2010, 
 Amores que matan, Joaquín Mortiz, 1996; Editorial Planeta Mexicana Sa De cv, 2008, 
 El paraíso que fuimos, 2002; 
 Alta infidelidad 2006; 
 Optimistas, Editorial Aldus, 2006, 
 
 El cuerpo expuesto (2013)

References

External links

Official website

1960 births
20th-century Mexican writers
National Autonomous University of Mexico alumni
University of California, Los Angeles alumni
University of California, Los Angeles faculty
Academic staff of the Hebrew University of Jerusalem
Academic staff of University Ramon Llull
University of Colorado faculty
Writers from Mexico City
Living people